The Harper Novel Prize was an award presented by Harper Brothers, an American publishing company located in New York City, New York.

The award was presented to the best novel by an "a writer who hitherto had not found a wide audience".  A number of the awarded books went on to win the Pulitzer Prize for Fiction and many were adapted into films.

Winners
Winners of the Harper Prize included:
 1922–1923: Margaret Wilson, The Able McLaughlins

 1925: Anne Parrish, The Perennial Bachelor
 1927: Glenway Wescott, The Grandmothers: A Family Portrait
 1929: Julien Green, Leviathan
 1931: Robert Raynolds, Brothers in the West
 1933: Paul Horgan, The Fault of Angels
 1935: Harold Lenoir Davis, Honey in the Horn
 1937: Frederic Prokosch, The Seven Who Fled
 1939: Vardis Fisher, Children of God 
 1941: Judith Kelly, Marriage Is a Private Affair
 1943: Martin Flavin, Journey in the Dark
 1945: Jo Sinclair, Wasteland
 1947: Joseph Hitrec, Son of the Moon
 1949: Max Steele, Debby
 1955: Don Mankiewicz, Trial
 1957: Frank Norris, Tower in the West
 1959: Robin White, Elephant Hill
 1961: Herbert Lobsenz, Vangel Griffin
 1963: Richard McKenna, The Sand Pebbles
 1965: C. D. B. Bryan, P.S. Wilkinson

See also
 List of American literary awards

References

External links
Good Reads list of winners

1922 establishments in New York City
1960s disestablishments in New York (state)
Awards established in 1922
Awards disestablished in 1965
Biennial events
Culture of New York City
American fiction awards